Zulma R. Toro is an American engineer and academic administrator who has served as the president of Central Connecticut State University since January 2017.

Early life and education 
Toro was born and raised in Puerto Rico. 

She earned a Bachelor of Science degree in industrial engineering from the University of Puerto Rico, followed by a Master of Science in industrial and operations engineering from the University of Michigan. Toro then earned a Ph.D. in industrial and systems engineering from Georgia Tech.

Career 
Prior to joining CCSU, Toro served as the executive vice chancellor and provost of the University of Arkansas at Little Rock, Dean of the Wichita State University College of Engineering, Dean of the Tagliatela College of Engineering at the University of New Haven, and chancellor of the University of Puerto Rico at Mayagüez where she was removed after 20 months in that position by the president of the university after a strike that lasted two weeks. During the strike, which was started by the faculty and students, the school was closed. 

Toro became the 13th President of Central Connecticut State University in January 2017, the first female and Latino to serve in the role. Toro succeeded John "Jack" W. Miller, who retired on September 19, 2016.

Toro's time at CCSU has been marred by numerous controversies. She has been accused of abusing her power and public shaming.

References 

Puerto Rican academics
University of Puerto Rico alumni
University of Michigan alumni
Georgia Tech alumni
Central Connecticut State University faculty
Year of birth missing (living people)
Living people